Ambléon  is a commune in the Ain department in the Auvergne-Rhône-Alpes region of eastern France.

Geography
The village of Ambléon is located ten kilometres west of Belley and 60 km east of Lyon in a wetland (lakes, swamps, bogs) in the Bas-Bugey mountain range, 400 metres above sea level.  The site is dominated by the Tentanet mountain (1019 m) on the slopes of which is the Lac d'Ambléon of glacial origin whose ecological interest is recognised.

Access to the commune is by road D24  which branches from the D10 south of the commune (north of Premeyzel) and passes through the commune to the village then continues north to join the D41 just north of the commune. The D41 road comes from Saint-Germain-les-Paroisses in the north through the commune then passes near Lac d'Ambléon before continuing over the mountains west to join the D79 road near Lhuis. The D41 does not pass through the village but there is a connecting country road from it to the village. There are a few other small country roads in the commune. There is some farming activity along the D24 road but most of the commune is forested hills and mountains.

The Serrin stream rises to the west of the village and passes through it before joining the Setrin stream which flows south through the commune to join the Gland stream south of the commune.

Administration

List of successive mayors of Ambléon

Population

Economy

The Ambléon economy is based on agriculture (livestock and grain).

The town is located within the Appellation d'origine contrôlée (AOC) zone for the wines of Bugey.

Sights
The Chateau of Ambléon (private residence)
A Chapel (13th century)
The War memorial to the maquis of Ambléon

Personalities
Theodore Chavanton called Avanton, author of the folk novel The Lost Oasis (1945) and a teacher at the Ambléon school. His story takes place in Lombane (an anagram of Ambléon)

See also
Communes of the Ain department

References

External links
Community of communes of Bugey Sud website 
Ambléon on Géoportail, National Geographic Institute (IGN) website 
Ambléon on the 1750 Cassini Map

Communes of Ain
Ambarri